Theodore Matthew "Tim" Solso (born March 5, 1947), is an American businessman that served as the chairman of General Motors, from January 15, 2014, to January 4, 2016, where he was succeeded by General Motors CEO Mary Barra. Prior to that, Solso served as the chief executive officer of Cummins from 2000 to 2011.

Personal life
Solso was born in Spokane, Washington to Virgil Edward Solso and Dorothy Jane Burger Solso. Solso graduated from DePauw University in 1969 with a degree in psychology and received an MBA from Harvard University.

References

1947 births
Cummins people
Living people
General Motors executives
Businesspeople from Spokane, Washington
Harvard Business School alumni
American chairpersons of corporations
American chief executives of Fortune 500 companies
DePauw University alumni